Simaika Mikaele (born 9 May 1978) is a rugby union player in the Samoa Sevens team. He represented Samoa from 2001 to 2008. 

Mikaele is from Vailele on the island of Upolu in Samoa.

References

External links
ESPN Scrum Profile

Living people
Samoan rugby union players
1978 births
Male rugby sevens players
People from Tuamasaga
Samoa international rugby sevens players
Samoa international rugby union players